Lieutenant-Colonel Henry Eyre  (4 February 1834 – 24 June 1904) was a British Army officer and Conservative Party politician.

Eyre was born the son of Rev. Charles Wasteneys Eyre, Rector of Carlton in Lindrick, Nottinghamshire and was educated at Harrow and Christ Church, Oxford. He inherited Rampton Manor from his father in 1862.

A Rifle Brigade officer, he served in the Crimean War, being present at the siege and fall of Sebastopol and wounded at the assault of the Redan. He served throughout the Indian Mutiny and was present at the taking of Lucknow, capture of Mynponee and operations in the Central India Campaign on the Ram Gunga River. He was present in the actions of Gwalior (included a mention in the despatch of Sir Hugh Rose) and the capture of Kalpi with the Camel Corps. This unit was formed from four officers and 100 men from the 2nd and 3rd Battalions Rifle Brigade. An elite unit, the officers were carefully picked due to the required level in independent command. He retired from the army in 1858 and entered the Militia.

He was High Sheriff of Nottinghamshire in 1873 and was elected at the 1886 general election as the Member of Parliament (MP) for Gainsborough, with a majority of only 85 votes (1.0% of the total). He was defeated at the 1892 general election, and stood unsuccessfully in Mansfield at the 1895 general election.
He was awarded C.B. in 1887.

In 1893 he sold the Rampton estate by auction. He died at Lincoln in 1904. His body was cremated and his ashes interred in Rampton Churchyard.

References

 Ramptom Manor

External links 
 

1834 births
1904 deaths
People from Carlton in Lindrick
People educated at Harrow School
Alumni of Christ Church, Oxford
Rifle Brigade officers
British Army personnel of the Crimean War
British military personnel of the Indian Rebellion of 1857
British Militia officers
Companions of the Order of the Bath
Conservative Party (UK) MPs for English constituencies
UK MPs 1886–1892
High Sheriffs of Nottinghamshire